Roger Federer was the defending champion, but lost in the quarterfinals to Julien Benneteau.
Juan Martín del Potro won the title, defeating Benneteau in the final 7–6(7–2), 6–3.

Seeds

Draw

Finals

Top half

Bottom half

Qualifying

Seeds

Qualifiers

Lucky losers
  Tobias Kamke

Draw

First qualifier

Second qualifier

Third qualifier

Fourth qualifier

External links
 Main draw
 Qualifying draw

ABN AMRO World Tennis Tournament - Singles
2013 ABN AMRO World Tennis Tournament